Niki is a first given unisex name. Variant of the male Nikias(Ancient Greek) and female Nicole, a female form of Nicholas (French) 

In music:

 Niki Barr, American musician
 Niki Chow, Hong Kong actress and Cantopop singer
 Niki Haris, singer, dancer, and backing vocalist
 Niki Sullivan, American rock and roll guitar player
 NIKI (singer), Indonesian R&B singer and songwriter
 Niki Shiina, fictional singer from the franchise Ensemble Stars!
In film/television:

 Niki Caro, film director and screenwriter who was born in Wellington, New Zealand
 Niki de Saint Phalle, French sculptor, painter, and film maker
 Niki Karimi, multi-award-winning Iranian actress and movie director
 Niki Linardou (1939–2012), Greek film and stage actress
 Niki Marvin, film producer active since the 1980s
 Niki Sanders, a fictional character on the television show Heroes
 Niki Stevens, a fictional character on the television show The L Word

In sports:
 Niki Bakoyianni, Greek high jumper
 Niki Garagouni, Greek volleyball player
 Niki Jedlicka (born 1987), Austrian poker player
 Niki Jenkins, Canadian judoka
 Niki Lauda, Austrian entrepreneur, former Formula One racing driver and three-time Formula One World Champion
 Niki Leferink, Dutch football (soccer) player
 Niki Panetta, Greek triple jumper
 Niki-Katerina Sidiropoulou, Greek fencer
 Niki Xanthou, Greek long jumper
 Niki Zimling, Danish football (soccer) player

In other fields:

 Niki Albon, British YouTuber and radio personality
 Niki Davis, New Zealand computer scientist
 Niki Goulandris, Greek philanthropist
 Niki Marangou, Cypriot writer and artist
 Niki Taylor, American model
 Niki Tzavela, Greek politician

See also

Nicki
Nikii Daas
Nikki (given name)

de:Niki